The initialism PVL may refer to:

 Premier Volleyball League, a professional volleyball league in the Philippines
 Periventricular leukomalacia, the death of brain tissue, caused by lack of oxygen
 Proliferative verrucous leukoplakia, a condition in the oral mucosa
 Parameter Value Language, the data markup language, used by NASA
 Panton–Valentine leukocidin, a factor in bacterial virulence
 The paleontological collection of the Fundación-Instituto Miguel Lillo, Universidad Nacional de Tucumán
 Pioneer Valley League, a high school athletic conference in Massachusetts
 Program Validation Limited, a British company that developed SPARK
 The Pascack Valley Line, a commuter rail line operated by NJ Transit
 Peter Van Loan, a Canadian politician
 The Rus' Primary Chronicle
 Pike County Airport in Pikeville, Kentucky, IATA Code
 Postal Officers' Union, Finland